TAFE Open Learning is a single point of contact for customers seeking distance education. TAFE Open Learning is located in South Brisbane, Queensland.

TAFE Open Learning provides both Vocational Education Training (VET) and My Learning Short Course Collection courses through partnerships with Barrier Reef Institute of TAFE, Brisbane North Institute of TAFE, SkillsTech Australia and Southern Queensland Institute of TAFE.

Courses provided by TAFE Open Learning are delivered through print based correspondence, online learning environments or blended learning methods.

Learning Network Queensland and UniLearn operate in co-operation with TAFE Open Learning.

History 
The Open Learning Institute of TAFE merged with Brisbane North Institute of TAFE in 2006. This merger was the result of a major overhaul of Queensland TAFE operations as detailed in the Queensland Skills Plan. This merger prompted the establishment of TAFE Open Learning as a new business unit. TAFE Open Learning now contributes increasing awareness for consumers seeking flexible off campus learning.

Courses 

Courses provided by TAFE Open Learning include:
business and finance
community and human services
construction and engineering
education and training
government/Public sector
information technology
justice administration
literacy, English language and tertiary preparation for adults
science, animal science and environment
travel and tourism
short courses

See also 

Learning Network Queensland
UniLearn
Barrier Reef Institute of TAFE
Brisbane North Institute of TAFE
SkillsTech Australia
Southern Queensland Institute of TAFE

References

External links 
TAFE Open Learning
Learning Network Queensland
UniLearn
Barrier Reef Institute of TAFE
Brisbane North Institute of TAFE
SkillsTech Australia
Southern Queensland Institute of TAFE
TAFE Queensland

Technical and further education